Aron Gustafsson  (25 September 1880 – 20 May 1963) was a Swedish farmer and politician, who represented the Centre Party.

Gustafsson was born and died in Lekåsa.  He was a member of the lower house of the Parliament of Sweden from 1933, elected in the constituency of the former County of Skaraborg.

References
 This article was initially translated from the Swedish Wikipedia article.

Members of the Riksdag from the Centre Party (Sweden)
1880 births
1963 deaths
Members of the Andra kammaren